Idris is a genus of parasitic wasps in the family Platygastridae, containing about 160 described species. This genus is part of the tribe Baeini, which are egg parasitoids. Members of the genus Idris are mostly parasitoids of spider eggs, but at least one member of the genus uses stink bugs as hosts.

Species

Species:
Idris adikeshavus 
Idris aenea 
Idris affinis 
Idris agraensis 
Idris alticola 
Idris alticollis 
Idris amplus 
Idris angustipennis 
Idris annexia 
Idris appangalus 
Idris arachnevora 
Idris ater 
Idris aureonitens 
Idris aureus 
Idris badius 
Idris balteus 
Idris benoiti 
Idris bicolor 
Idris bicolor 
Idris bidentatus 
Idris brachystigmatis 
Idris brevicornis 
Idris brevifunicularis 
Idris brevis 
Idris brunneus 
Idris carbo 
Idris castaneus 
Idris chotanagpurensis 
Idris chrysion 
Idris citrinus 
Idris cleon 
Idris clypealis 
Idris coloris 
Idris coorgensis 
Idris costatus 
Idris coxalis 
Idris cteatus 
Idris cubensis 
Idris curtus 
Idris deergakombus 
Idris denkis 
Idris denkis 
Idris densis 
Idris densis 
Idris dentatus 
Idris desertorum 
Idris destructor 
Idris diversus 
Idris dubarensis 
Idris dugandani 
Idris dunensis 
Idris elba

References

Parasitic wasps
Scelioninae
Hymenoptera genera